Helen Grace James (born in Pennsylvania) is a physical therapist and U.S. military veteran. She served in the United States Air Force, where she achieved the rank of Airman Second Class. She was discharged from the military as "undesirable" during the Lavender Scare campaign to remove lesbian and gay people from government employment. In 1960, she was able to upgrade her status from "undesirable" to "General Discharge under Honorable Conditions". In 2018, she successfully sued the U.S. Air Force to upgrade her discharge to "honorable,” which allowed her to receive full veteran benefits that were previously unavailable to her.

Life and career 
Helen G. James enlisted in the United States Air Force in 1952. She started as a radio operator and was later promoted to crew chief. Eventually she achieved the rank of Airman Second Class. In 1955, the Office of Special Investigations (OSI) started following and spying her as part of the Lavender Scare campaign to remove lesbian and gay people from government employment. They arrested her and interrogated her for hours, and finally she was discharged as "undesirable" from the US Air Force.

After that, she moved to California, where she got an advanced degree in physical therapy from Stanford University. She has been a physical therapist ever since. From 1972 she was a member of the faculty at California State University, Fresno, until she went into private practice in 1989.

In 1960, she was able to upgrade her status from "undesirable" to "General Discharge under Honorable Conditions." However, that status did not allow her to have access to basic services other veterans could receive, such as healthcare or banking benefits from the USAA. In 2018 she successfully sued the US Air Force to change her status to “honorable”, making her eligible for all veterans benefits, including access to healthcare from the U.S. Department of Veterans Affairs and burial in a national cemetery.

In January 2018, she decided to donate her album of photographs to the Smithsonian, to be featured in the National Air and Space Museum.

References 

Living people
Women in the United States Air Force
LGBT military personnel
LGBT people from Pennsylvania
Military personnel from Pennsylvania
American physiotherapists
Stanford University alumni
California State University, Fresno faculty
American LGBT rights activists
1928 births